Pogogyne is a small genus of flowering plants in the mint family known generally as mesamints or mesa mints. They are native to Oregon, Idaho, California, and Baja California.

These are small annual plants with glandular, aromatic foliage. They are somewhat variable in appearance but are mostly minty-scented herbs with leaves and flower inflorescences bordered with stiff hairs. The flowers are white or a shade of purple or pinkish-lavender. The best known species is the critically endangered vernal pool species San Diego mesa mint, P. abramsii, which is now found only in a few isolated patches of ground near San Diego, California.

Species
 Pogogyne abramsii Howell - San Diego mesa mint - San Diego  County
 Pogogyne clareana J.T.Howell - Santa Lucia mesa mint - Monterey County
 Pogogyne douglasii Benth. - Douglas' mesa mint - Central + Northern California (Coast Ranges + Central Valley)
 Pogogyne floribunda Jokerst - profuseflower mesa mint - northern California, southern Oregon, southwestern Idaho
 Pogogyne nudiuscula A.Gray - Otay mesa mint - San Diego  County + northern Baja California
 Pogogyne serpylloides  (Torr.) A.Gray - thymeleaf mesa mint - California + Baja California
 Pogogyne zizyphoroides Benth. - Sacramento mesa mint - northern + central California, southwestern Oregon

References

External links
Calflora: Database: Pogogyne — genus and species.

 
Lamiaceae genera
Flora of California
Flora of the Western United States